"Timber!" is a song recorded by the Bee Gees, written by Barry Gibb. The song was released in Australia as their second single in July 1963, backed with "Take Hold of That Star". It was later included on the group's first album The Bee Gees Sing and Play 14 Barry Gibb Songs.

In September 1963, it was included as the first track on their first EP "The Bee Gees", as well as being included on their compilation album Brilliant of Birth in 1998.

Recording
"Timber!" was recorded in June 1963 in Festival Studio, Sydney. Robert Iredale was the engineer in charge. 
Barry Gibb was the lead vocals in the song, with Robin and Maurice Gibb singing the harmony vocals.

Chart performance
In Australia, the song peaked at #75.

Personnel
Partial credits sourced from Joseph Brennan.
Barry Gibb – lead vocals, rhythm guitar
Robin Gibb – harmony and backing vocals
Maurice Gibb – harmony and backing vocals
Uncredited musicians – double bass, drums, violin, piano

References

Bee Gees songs
1963 singles
1963 songs
Songs written by Barry Gibb
Leedon Records singles